Amphineurion is a genus of plants in the family Apocynaceae, first described as a genus in 1948. It contains only one known species, Amphineurion marginatum, native to Cambodia, S China (Guangdong, Hainan), India, Indonesia, Laos, Malaysia, Philippines, Thailand and Vietnam.

Description & habitat
When young, it sometimes forms a shrub with arching branches. Its habitats are mountain forests and seashore thickets.

Uses
In times of famine, including during the Khmer Rouge regime years, the people of Cambodia eat the young leaves and stem of this climber, called krâllam' paè or trâllam' paè in Khmer language. Various parts of the plant are also used in traditional medicine to treat a number of ailments, including menstruation problems.

References

Flora of Asia
Monotypic Apocynaceae genera
Apocyneae